Elmira Corning Regional Airport  is in Chemung County, New York, seven miles northwest of Elmira and eight miles east of Corning. It is in the town of Big Flats but its mailing address is Horseheads, New York. The airport was formerly Elmira Regional Airport.

Situated just north of the Southern Tier Expressway (Interstate 86), the airport serves the Southern Tier of New York and Northern Tier of Pennsylvania with airline flights, general aviation, and glider activities. Other airports in the area include Greater Binghamton Airport and Ithaca Tompkins International Airport, with Greater Rochester International Airport and Syracuse Hancock International Airport lying farther afield.

Facilities
It has three runways: 6/24 is 8,001 by 150 feet (2,439 x 46 m) asphalt; 10/28 is 5,404 by 150 feet (1,647 x 46 m) asphalt; 5/23 is 2,017 by 150 feet (615 x 46 m) turf.

The airport had three paved runways about 4000 feet long in a north–south, east–west and northeast–southwest orientation in the early years, but the northeast–southwest runway
was 4702 feet in length by 1960, was extended to 5604 feet by the 1960s with later extensions to 7000 feet and 7600 feet before its present length of 8001
feet. The east–west runway was extended to about 5200 feet by the early 1980s and the north–south runway was abandoned and the additional roughly 200 feet of the east–west runway was added by converting part of the overrun on the east end of the runway to usable pavement (for takeoff), but then the landing threshold was displaced about 400 feet.

In the year ending June 30, 2013 the airport had 22,164 aircraft operations, average 61 per day: 51% general aviation, 33% air taxi, 13% airline and 2% military. 33 aircraft were then based at the airport: 52% single-engine, 15% multi-engine, 30% jet, and 3% helicopter. Airport services include free wireless Internet, automatic teller machines (ATM), conference rooms, and a Dunkin' Donuts restaurant.

Airlines
Allegiant Air
Delta Connection operated by SkyWest Airlines on behalf of Delta Air Lines

Low-cost carrier Allegiant Air has the only scheduled mainline flights, on Airbus A319s & Airbus A320s. Delta Connection service is flown with Canadair CRJ-200s, CRJ-700s, and CRJ-900s.

Mohawk /Allegheny/USAir flew to Elmira until 2001 when its affiliate took over; Elmira's first jets were Mohawk BAC-111s in 1965. The airport had flights on Capital Airlines, which merged with United in 1961; United left Elmira in 1966.

United Airlines regional flights to Chicago-O’hare started in 2014 and ended in 2016. In 2018 United served a new route to Newark. The route was eventually switched to Washington-Dulles; that ended January 6, 2020.

Fixed-base operators

General aviation facilities are in a separate terminal away from the airline services. Atlantic Aviation has fueling, landing fees, hangar space for all non commercial aircraft. First Flight has worldwide aircraft charters, management, and other services. FirstAir has many different aircraft for any charter need and a flight school; Skyline Air offers flight training.

Wings of Eagles
An aviation museum, the Wings of Eagles Discovery Center, is near the airport. The museum has about 20 display aircraft or full-size replicas.

Renovation
In 2016 the airport received a $40 million grant from the state for a major redesign. The improvements aimed to increase airport passenger space, add two new jet bridges, 300 parking spaces, and a 3,000 square foot bar and restaurant. On November 2, 2018, Governor Andrew Cuomo announced that the renovations were complete.

Airlines and destinations

Passenger

Cargo

Statistics

Top destinations

Accidents and incidents

On June 23, 1967 Mohawk Airlines Flight 40, a BAC One-Eleven, crashed in Blossburg, Pennsylvania, shortly after taking off from Elmira/Corning, killing all 34 persons (30 passengers and 4 crew) on board.

References

External links

 Elmira Corning Regional Airport, official site
 
 
 

Airports in New York (state)
Transportation buildings and structures in Chemung County, New York
Corning, New York
Elmira, New York